Australia competed at the 1992 Summer Olympics in Barcelona, Spain.  Australian athletes have competed in every Summer Olympic Games of the modern era. 279 competitors, 187 men and 92 women, took part in 153 events in 25 sports.

Medalists

Competitors
The following is the list of number of competitors in the Games.

Archery

In the sixth Olympic archery competition that Australia contested, the nation sent three men. Grant Greenham had the nation's only individual win, though the trio also won their first match in the team round.

Men's Individual Competition:
Grant Greenham – Round of 16, 16th place (1-1)
Simon Fairweather – Round of 32, 25th place (0-1)
Scott Hunter-Russell – Ranking round, 48th place (0-0)

Men's team competition:
Greenham, Fairweather, and Hunter-Russell – quarterfinal, 7th place (1-1)

Athletics

Men's Competition
Men's 200 metres
Dean Capobianco
 Heat – 20.86
 Quarterfinals – 20.61 (→ did not advance, 17th place)

Men's 400 metres
Mark Garner
 Heat – 46.26
 Quarterfinals – 46.85 (→ did not advance, 28th place)

Men's 400m Hurdles
Simon Hollingsworth
 Heat – 49.74 (→ did not advance, 22nd place)

Men's Marathon
Robert de Castella
 Final – 2:17.44 (→ 26th place)
Steve Moneghetti
 Final – 2:23.42 (→ 48th place)

Men's 20 km Walk
Nick A'Hern
 Final – 1:31:39 (→ 22nd place)
Andrew Jachno
 Final – 1:36:49 (→ 31st place)

Men's 50 km Walk
Simon Baker
 Final – 4:08:11 (→ 19th place)

Men's High Jump
Tim Forsyth
 Qualification – 2.26 m
 Final – 2.34 m (→  Bronze Medal)
Lochsley Thomson
 Qualification – 2.20 m (→ did not advance, 19th place)
David Anderson
 Qualification – 2.15 m (→ did not advance, 31st place)

Men's Long Jump
David Culbert
 Qualification – 8.00 m
 Final – 7.73 m (→ 11th place)

Men's Hammer Throw
Sean Carlin
 Qualification – 75.90 m
 Final – 76.16 m (→ 8th place)

Men's Discus Throw
Werner Reiterer
 Qualification – 62.20 m
 Final – 60.12 m (→ 10th place)

Men's Pole Vault 
 Simon Arkell
 Qualification – 5.30m (→ did not advance, 22nd place)

Men's Decathlon 
 Dean Smith
 final result – 7703pts (→ 19th place)

Women's Competition
Women's 100 metres
Kerry Johnson
 Heat – 11.62
 Quarterfinals – 11.59 (→ did not advance, 19th place)
Melinda Gainsford-Taylor
 Heat – 11.57
 Quarterfinals – 11.67 (→ did not advance, 24th place)

Women's 200 metres
Melinda Gainsford-Taylor
 Heat – 23.18
 Quarterfinals – 23.03
 Semifinals – 23.03 (→ did not advance, 13th place)
Melissa Medlicott
 Heat – 23.86 (→ did not advance, 30th place)

Women's 400 metres
Michelle Lock
 Heat – 52.49
 Quarterfinals – 51.71
 Semifinals – 50.78 (→ did not advance, 11th place)
Renee Poetschka
 Heat – 52.85
 Quarterfinals – 52.05
 Semifinals – 52.09 (→ did not advance, 15th place)
Cathy Freeman
 Heat – 53.70
 Quarterfinals – 51.52 (→ did not advance, 17th place)

Women's 3,000 metres
Krishna Stanton
 Heat – 9:00.62 (→ did not advance, 22nd place)

Women's 10,000 metres
Susan Hobson
 Heat – 32:53.61 (→ did not advance, 21st place)

Women's 4 × 100 m Relay
 Melinda Gainsford-Taylor, Kerry Johnson, Melissa Medlicott, and Kathy Sambell
 Heat – 43.49
 final – 43.77 (→ 6th place)

Women's 4 × 400 m Relay
 Susan Andrews, Cathy Freeman, Michelle Lock, and Renee Poetschka
 Heat – 3:25.68
 final – 3:26.42 (→ 7th place)

Women's Marathon
Lisa Ondieki
 Final – did not finish (→ no ranking)

Women's 10 km Walk
Kerry Junna-Saxby
 Final – 46:01 (→ 15th place)
Gabrielle Blythe
 Final – 50:13 (→ 31st place)

Women's 400m Hurdles
Gail Luke
 Heat – 58.32 (→ did not advance, 23rd place)

Women's High Jump
 Alison Inverarity
 Qualification – 1.92 m
 Final – 1.91 m (→ 8th place)

Women's Long Jump
 Nicole Boegman
 Qualification – no mark (→ did not advance, no ranking)

Women's Discus Throw
 Daniela Costian
 Heat – 65.94m
 Final – 66.24m (→  Bronze Medal)

Women's Javelin Throw
 Louise Currey
 Heat – 60.56m
 Final – 56.00m (→ 11th place)
 Sue Howland
 Heat – did not compete (→ did not advance, no ranking)

Women's Heptathlon
Jane Flemming
 final result – fid not finish 58.32 (→ no ranking)

Badminton

Basketball

Men's team competition
Preliminary round (Group B):
 Defeated Puerto Rico (116-76)
 Lost to Unified Team (63-85)
 Defeated Venezuela (78-71)
 Defeated PR China (88-66)
 Lost to Lithuania (87-98)
Quarter-finals:
 Lost to Croatia (65-98)
Classification Matches:
 5th/8th place: Defeated Germany (109-79)
 5th/6th place: Lost to Brazil (80-90) → 6th place
Team Roster:
 ( 4.) John Dorge
 ( 5.) Mike McKay
 ( 6.) Phil Smyth
 ( 7.) Larry Sengstock
 ( 8.) Damian Keogh
 ( 9.) Leroy Loggins
 (10.) Andrew Gaze
 (11.) Shane Heal
 (12.) Mark Bradtke
 (13.) Luc Longley
 (14.) Andrew Vlahov
 (15.) Ray Borner
Head coach: Adrian Hurley

Boxing

Canoeing

Cycling

Sixteen cyclists, thirteen men and three women, represented Australia in 1992.

Men's road race
 Grant Rice
 Darren Smith
 Patrick Jonker

Men's team time trial
 Robert Crowe
 Darren Lawson
 Robert McLachlan
 Grant Rice

Men's sprint
 Gary Neiwand

Men's 1 km time trial
 Shane Kelly

Men's individual pursuit
 Mark Kingsland

Men's team pursuit
 Brett Aitken
 Stephen McGlede
 Shaun O'Brien
 Stuart O'Grady

Men's points race
 Stephen McGlede

Women's road race
 Kathy Watt – 2:04:42 (→  Gold Medal)
 Kathleen Shannon – 2:05:03 (→ 7th place)
 Jacqui Uttien – 2:05:03 (→ 13th place)

Women's individual pursuit
 Kathy Watt

Diving

Men's 3m Springboard
Michael Murphy
 Preliminary round – 381.33 points
 Final – 611.97 points (→ 4th place)
Simon McCormack
 Preliminary round – 358.05 points (→ did not advance, 16th place)

Men's 10m Platform
Craig Rogerson
 Preliminary round – 388.83 points
Final – 458.43 points (→ 12th place)
Michael Murphy
 Preliminary round – 371.88 (→ did not advance, 13th place)

Women's 3m Springboard
 Jennifer Donnet
 Preliminary round – 272.64 (→ did not advance, 15th place)
 Rachel Wilkes
 Preliminary round – 254.31 (→ did not advance, 22nd place)

Women's 10m Platform
Vyninka Arlow
Final – 365.88 points (→ 10th place)
April Adams
Final – 342.39 points (→ 11th place)

Equestrianism

Fencing

Men's épée
 Robert Davidson
 Scott Arnold

Football

Men's team competition
Preliminary round (Group B)
 Australia – Ghana 1-3
 Australia – Mexico 1-1
 Australia – Denmark 3-0
Quarter-finals
 Australia – Sweden 2-1
Semi-finals
 Australia – Poland 1-6
Bronze Medal Match
 Australia – Ghana 0-1
Team Roster
 ( 1.) John Filan
 ( 2.) Milan Blagojevic
 ( 3.) Dominic Longo
 ( 4.) Ned Zelic
 ( 5.) Shaun Murphy
 ( 6.) Tony Vidmar
 ( 7.) John Gibson
 ( 8.) Paul Okon
 ( 9.) Zlatko Arambasic
 (10.) George Slifkas
 (11.) John Markovski
 (12.) Damian Mori
 (13.) Carl Veart
 (14.) Steve Refenes
 (15.) Tony Popovic
 (16.) David Seal
 (17.) Gary Hasler
 (18.) Steve Corica
 (19.) Brad Maloney
 (20.) Mark Bosnich
Head coach: Eddie Thomson

Gymnastics

Hockey

Men's team competition
Preliminary round (Group A)
 Australia – Argentina 7 - 0
 Australia – Egypt 5 - 1
 Australia – Germany 1 - 1
 Australia – India 1 - 0
 Australia – Great Britain 6 - 0
Semi-finals
 Australia – The Netherlands 3 - 2
Final
 Australia – Germany 1 - 2 (→  Silver Medal)
Team Roster
 ( 1.) Warren Birmingham (captain)
 ( 2.) David Wansbrough
 ( 3.) John Bestall
 ( 4.) Lee Bodimeade
 ( 5.) Ashley Carey
 ( 6.) Stephen Davies
 ( 7.) Damon Diletti (gk)
 ( 8.) Lachlan Dreher (gk)
 ( 9.) Lachlan Elmer
 (10.) Dean Evans
 (11.) Gregory Corbitt
 (12.) Paul Lewis
 (13.) Graham Reid
 (14.) Jay Stacy
 (15.) Ken Wark
 (16.) Michael York

Women's team competition
Preliminary round (Group A)
 Australia – Canada 2 - 0
 Australia – Germany 0 - 1
 Australia – Spain 0 - 1
Classification Matches
 5th-8th place: Australia – New Zealand 5 - 1
 5th-6th place: Australia – The Netherlands 2 - 0
Team Roster
 ( 1.) Kathleen Partridge (gk)
 ( 2.) Christine Dobson
 ( 3.) Liane Tooth
 ( 4.) Alyson Annan
 ( 5.) Juliet Haslam
 ( 6.) Michelle Hager
 ( 7.) Alison Peek
 ( 8.) Lisa Powell
 ( 9.) Lisa Naughton (gk)
 (10.) Kate Starre
 (11.) Sally Carbon
 (12.) Jackie Pereira
 (13.) Tracey Belbin
 (14.) Rechelle Hawkes
 (15.) Sharon Buchanan
 (16.) Debbie Bowman-Sullivan
Head coach: Brian Glencross

Judo

Modern Pentathlon

Three male pentathletes represented Australia in 1992.

Men's Individual Competition:
Gavin Lackey → 30th place (5,111 points)
Colin Hamilton → 58th place (4,594 points)
Alex Watson → 63rd place (4,279 points)

Men's team competition:
Lackey, Hamilton, and Watson → 16th place (13,984 points)

Rowing

Sailing

Men's Sailboard (Lechner A-390)
Lars Kleppich
 Final ranking – 98.7 points (→  Bronze Medal)

Women's Sailboard (Lechner A-390)
Fiona Taylor
 Final ranking – 136.0 points (→ 10th place)

Women's 470 Class
Jennifer Lidgett and Ady Bucek
 Final ranking – 80.4 points (→ 9th place)

Shooting

Swimming

Men's 50 m Freestyle
 Darren Lange
 Heat – 23.01
 B-Final – 22.69 (→ 9th place)
 Angus Waddell
 Heat – 23.10
 B-Final – 23.06 (→ 15th place)

Men's 100 m Freestyle
 Chris Fydler
 Heat – 50.26
 B-Final – 50.78 (→ 14th place)
 Andrew Baildon
 Heat – 50.59
 B-Final – 50.93 (→ 16th place)

Men's 200m Freestyle
 Kieren Perkins
 Heat – 1:49.26
 B-Final – 1:49.75 (→ 10th place)
 Ian Brown
 Heat – 1:49.32
 B-Final – 1:49.77 (→ 11th place)

Men's 400m Freestyle
 Kieren Perkins
 Heat – 3:49.24
 Final – 3:45.16 (→  Silver Medal)
 Ian Brown
 Heat – 3:50.12
 Final – 3:48.79 (→ 5th place)

Men's 1500m Freestyle
 Kieren Perkins
 Heat – 15:02.75
 Final – 14:43.48 (→  Gold Medal)
 Glen Housman
 Heat – 15:11.36
 Final – 14:55.29 3:48.79 (→  Silver Medal)

Men's 100m Backstroke
 Tom Stachewicz
 Heat – 57.03 (→ did not advance, 19th place)
 Toby Haenen
 Heat – 1:00.08 (→ did not advance, 45th place)

Men's 200m Backstroke
 Toby Haenen
 Heat – 2:06.79 (→ did not advance, 35th place)

Men's 100m Breaststroke
 Phil Rogers
 Heat – 1:02.10
 Final – 1:01.76 (→  Bronze Medal)
 Shane Lewis
 Heat – 1:04.17 (→ did not advance, 28th place)

Men's 200m Breaststroke
 Phil Rogers
 Heat – 2:14.39
 Final – 2:13.59 (→ 6th place)
 Rodney Lawson
 Heat – 2:15.67
 B-Final – 2:15.50 (→ 9th place)

Men's 4 × 200 m Freestyle 
 Duncan Armstrong, Martin Roberts, Deane Pieters, and Ian Brown
 Heat – 7:22.19
 Deane Pieters, Duncan Armstrong, Ian Brown, and Kieren Perkins
 Final – DSQ (→ no ranking)

Synchronized Swimming

Two synchronized swimmers represented Australia in 1992.

Women's solo
 Semon Rohloff
 Celeste Ferraris

Women's duet
 Semon Rohloff
 Celeste Ferraris

Table Tennis

Tennis

Men's Singles Competition
Wally Masur
 First round – Lost to Pete Sampras (United States) 1-6, 6-7, 4-6
Richard Fromberg
 First round – Lost to Michael Stich (Germany) 3-6, 6-3, 1-6, 6-3, 3-6
Todd Woodbridge
 First round – Lost to Emilio Sánchez (Spain) 1-6, 6-7, 2-6

Men's Doubles Competition
John Fitzgerald and Todd Woodbridge
 First round – Defeated Roger Smith and Mark Knowles (Bahamas) 6-2, 6-3, 6-7, 4-6, 6-3
 Second round – Lost to Leander Paes and Ramesh Krishnan (India) 4-6, 5-7, 6-4, 1-6

Women's Singles Competition
Nicole Provis
 First round – Defeated Katia Piccolini (Italy) 6-1 6-0
 Second round – Lost to Sabine Appelmans (Belgium) 2-6 1-6
Jenny Byrne
 First round – Lost to Raffaella Reggi-Concato (Italy) 4-6 6-7
Rachel McQuillan
 First round – Lost to Sabine Appelmans (Belgium) 3-6, 3-6

Water Polo

Preliminary round (Group A)
 Lost to United States (4-8)
 Defeated France (9-5)
 Lost to Soviet Union (9-12)
 Tied with Germany (7-7)
 Defeated Czechoslovakia (15-9)
Classification Matches
 Defeated Cuba (7-5)
 Defeated Hungary (9-8) → Fifth place
Team Roster
Raymond Mayers
Glenn Townsend
Christopher Wybrow
Simon Asher
Geoffrey Clark
John Fox
Troy Stockwell
Andrew Wightman
Daniel Marsden
Mark Oberman
Greg McFadden
Guy Newman
Paul Oberman

Weightlifting

Wrestling

See also
Australia at the 1990 Commonwealth Games
Australia at the 1994 Commonwealth Games

References

Nations at the 1992 Summer Olympics
1992
Summer Olympics